SS Virginis is a Mira variable star that appears with a strong red hue. It varies in magnitude from a minimum of 9.5 to a maximum of 7.4 over a period of 361 days. It is also considered to be a semiregular variable star, as its minimum and maximum magnitude are themselves variable over a period of decades. Its spectral class is C63e. Because it is so rich in carbon, SS Virginis is classified as a carbon star, along with stars like T Geminorum. SS Virginis, like all carbon Mira variables, has a hydrogen-alpha emission line that varies widely, synchronized with the overall variations in light. The hydrogen-alpha emission line becomes far more prominent as the star becomes brighter. Observations made in the near-infrared spectrum indicate that it has a radius of 500 solar radii, and its temperature is between 2405 and 2485 kelvins.

The location of SS Virginis is two degrees north-following of η Virginis (Eta Virginis, Zaniah).

References
Citations

References

 

Virgo (constellation)
Mira variables
Virginis, SS
120212
108105
Durchmusterung objects